Dicaea or Dikaia ( or Δίκαια) was a town of ancient Macedonia, near the Chalcidice. It was an Eretrian colony as we can see from the Athenian tribute lists.

The site of Dicaea is located at Nea Kallikrateia, near modern Epanome.

References

Populated places in ancient Macedonia
Former populated places in Greece
Members of the Delian League